Sunt o babă comunistă is a 2013 Romanian drama film directed by Stere Gulea. It stars Luminița Gheorghiu, and Ana Ularu. Set in 2010 post-communist Romania, the title character and her husband are visited by their daughter who has been living in the United States for the last 10 years. This prompts her to reflect on the changes that have taken place during Romania since the fall of Communism. The film is cut with flashbacks to her halcyon communist days whilst she tries to fix her daughters' money problems.

The film is based on a novel with the same title by Dan Lungu. It was largely shot in Călărași and around the ruins of the Călărași steel works.

Cast
Luminița Gheorghiu – Emilia
 – Țucu
Ana Ularu – Alice
 – Mrs. Stroescu
Collin Blair – Alan
Andrei Huțuleac – Cătălin
Alexandra Buza – Celina
Coca Bloos – Maricica 
 – Sanda
Tania Popa – Aurelia
Gabriel Spahiu – Culidiuc
 – Sorin
Ionel Mihăilescu – Costel
Bogdan Talașman – milițian
Viorica Geanta Chelbea – Catrina
Eduard-Mihai Cârlan – Celestin
Constantin Drăgănescu – Nea Pancu
Paul Chiribuță – Nea Mitu
Petru Ghimbasan – Emilia's father
Patricia Poslusnic – young Alice
Ana Teona Petcu – young Emilia
 – Steel works director
Ingrid Bisu – Hairdresser 1
 – Hairdresser 2
Irina Drăgănescu – Hairdresser 3
Cristian Martin – Securitate officer at parade
Ion Grosu – Securitate officer at factory
Alexandru Potocean – film director
 – costume assistant
Daniel Popa – assistant director
Alexandra Botău – assistant director 2
 – department head
Mircea Andreescu – neighbor
Mihai Gruia Sandu – market seller
Șerban Pavlu – bus driver
Daniel Stanciu – janitor
Mara Căruțașu – Aurelia store saleswoman
Dan Tudor – Communist Party activist
Yun Tang – Chinese at marketplace
Ștefan Alexa – real estate agent

References

External links

2013 films
Romanian drama films